Altenburg is a city in Thuringia, Germany.

Altenburg may also refer to:

People
 Altenburg (surname)

Places

Towns and villages
 Altenburg, Missouri, US
 Altenburg, Lower Austria
 Altenburg, a village in Jestetten municipality, Germany
 Bad Deutsch-Altenburg, Lower Austria
 A hamlet in Märstetten municipality, Thurgau, Switzerland
 A village incorporated into Brugg municipality, Aargau, Switzerland
 A frazione or subdivision in Kaltern an der Weinstraße, South Tyrol, Italy

Historical
 Division of Altenburg, 1445: a division of lands in Thuringia and Saxony that led to war
 Saxe-Altenburg, a German duchy and state, in present-day Thuringia
 Saxe-Gotha-Altenburg, a German duchy related to Saxe-Altenburg (1680–1826)
 Raid at Altenburg (1813), in the War of the Sixth Coalition

Altenburg is the German exonym for the towns of:
 Vecpils, Latvia
 Baia de Criș, Hunedoara County, Romania
 Staré Hrady, Czech Republic
 Mosonmagyaróvár, Hungary

Castles
 Altenburg Castle, Switzerland
 Arnsburg Abbey, the site of mid-12th century Benedictine monastery Altenburg
 Altenburg (Bamberg), castle in Bavaria, Germany
 Altenburg (Heroldsbach), a levelled medieval fortification in Bavaria, Germany
 Heimburg Castle (also known as the Altenburg) in Saxony-Anhalt, Germany

Other
 Altenburg (Niedenstein), a mountain in Hesse, Germany
 Altenburg (Neuental), a mountain in Hesse, Germany
 Altenburg Abbey, a Benedictine monastery in Altenburg, Lower Austria
 9336 Altenburg, an asteroid belt discovered in 1991

See also
 Altenberg (disambiguation)